The Meisner technique is an approach to acting developed by American theatre practitioner Sanford Meisner.

The goal of the Meisner approach is for the actor to not focus on themselves and instead concentrate on the other actors in the immediate environment. To this end, some exercises for the Meisner technique are rooted in repetition so that the words are deemed insignificant compared to the underlying emotion. In the Meisner technique, there is a greater focus on the other actor as opposed to one's internal thoughts or feelings associated with the character.
The Meisner technique is different from method acting taught by Lee Strasberg, although both developed from the early teachings of Konstantin Stanislavski.

Components
Meisner training is an interdependent series of training exercises that build on one another. The more complex work supports a command of dramatic text. Students work on a series of progressively complex exercises to develop an ability to first improvise, then to access an emotional life, and finally to bring the spontaneity of improvisation and the richness of personal response to textual work. The techniques developed the behavioral strand of Stanislavski's. The technique is used to develop improvisation skills as well as "interpreting a script, and creating the specific physical characteristics of each character the actor played".

An example of a technique Meisner invented to train actors' responses is called the Repetition Exercise:

In this exercise, two actors sit across from each other and respond to each other through a repeated phrase.  Initially, the phrase refers to an external physical characteristic such as "You're wearing a red shirt." As the exercise progresses, it becomes more about each other's behavior, and reflects what is going on between them in the moment, such as "You look unhappy with me right now." The way this phrase is said as it is repeated changes in meaning, tone and intensity to correspond with the behavior that each actor produces towards the other. Through this device, the actor stops thinking of what to say and do, and responds more freely and spontaneously, both physically and vocally. The exercise also eliminates line readings, since the way the actor speaks becomes coordinated with his behavioral response.

About Meisner
To be an interesting actor – hell, to be an interesting human being – you must be authentic and for you to be authentic you must embrace who you really are, warts and all. Do you have any idea how liberating it is to not care what people think about you? Well, that's what we're here to do. — Sanford Meisner

Meisner began developing his approach to acting technique while working with the Group Theatre alongside director Lee Strasberg and actress Stella Adler. He continued developing his approach over the next fifty years while working with actors as head of the acting program at New York City's Neighborhood Playhouse School of the Theatre as well as while training actors in his private classes outside the Neighborhood Playhouse. During his lifetime he continued working toward a refinement in his ideas toward acting and in his approach to training actors, dropping some exercises he considered to be less effective along the way, while adding new ones he created to help solve the actor's problems in learning the craft.

In 1935, Sanford Meisner, one of the founding members of The Group Theatre (along with Stella Adler, Bobby Lewis, Harold Clurman, and Lee Strasberg), joined the faculty of The Neighborhood Playhouse. Over the years, he developed and refined what is now known as the Meisner Technique, a step-by-step procedure of self-investigation for the actor now globally recognized and among the foremost of modern acting techniques.
Meisner believed that the study of the actor's craft was rooted in acquiring a solid organic acting technique. It was a cornerstone of his teaching that this learning process occur not in a theoretical, abstract manner, but in the practical give and take of the classroom, where as he once said, "the students struggled to learn what I struggled to teach." Through that struggle the gifted student, over time gradually begins to emerge solidly in his or her work.

In 1980, a group of his alumni got together to preserve his teachings for future generations.  Sydney Pollack directed a master class taught by Sanford Meisner.  It was transferred to digital film in 2006.

Practitioners

The Neighborhood Playhouse had originally been founded as an off-Broadway theatre by philanthropists Alice Lewisohn and Irene Lewisohn in 1915, but closed in 1927. The following year, it re-opened as The Neighborhood Playhouse School of the Theatre with the addition of Rita Wallach Morgenthau. In 1935, Sanford Meisner, one of the founding members of The Group Theatre (along with Stella Adler, Bobby Lewis, Harold Clurman, and Lee Strasberg), joined the faculty of The Neighborhood Playhouse. Over the years, he developed and refined what is now known as the Meisner Technique. On October 18, 2018, the New York City Council officially recognized The Playhouse's 90th anniversary and Meisner's contributions to the school with an official Proclamation.

The William Esper Studio was founded in 1965 as a school for the performing arts in Manhattan, New York.  Its founder, William "Bill" Esper (1932—2019), is occasionally referred to as the best-known of Meisner's first generation teachers.

List of Meisner-trained actors
Actors who have trained in the Meisner technique include:

See also
 List of acting techniques

References

General references
 Banham, Martin, ed. 1998. The Cambridge Guide to Theatre. Cambridge: Cambridge UP. .
 Courtney, C. C. 2000. "The Neighborhood Playhouse." In Krasner (2000b, 291-295).
 Hirsch, Foster. 2000. "Actors and Acting." In Wilmeth and Bigsby (2000, 490-513).
 Hodge, Alison, ed. 2000. Twentieth Century Actor Training. London and New York: Routledge. .
 Kraner, David. 2000a. "Strasberg, Adler and Meisner: Method Acting." In Hodge (2000, 129-150).
 ---, ed. 2000b. Method Acting Reconsidered: Theory, Practice, Future. New York: St. Martin's P. .
 Longwell, Dennis, and Sanford Meisner. 1987. Sanford Meisner on Acting. New York: Random House. .
 Postlewait, Thomas. 1998. "Meisner, Sanford." In Banham (1998, 719).
 Wilmeth, Don B, and Christopher Bigsby, eds. 2000. The Cambridge History of American Theatre. Vol 3. Cambridge and New York: Cambridge UP. .

External links
 
 The Sanford Meisner Center

Acting techniques